Salvador Augusto Montaño (born October 25, 1984) is a Mexican mixed martial artist who competed in the welterweight division of the Ultimate Fighting Championship.

Mixed martial arts career

Early career
Montaño started training at age 15 in Kung Fu for sport and to know how to respond to the physical aggression and violence embedded in what he grew up in coming from a hard and dangerous neighborhood in Mexico.

Montaño made his professional mixed martial arts debut in November 2008. He won and defended middleweight titles in Xtreme Fighter Society, Xtreme Fighters Latino and Xtreme Kombat several times.

Montaño fought extensively in his native Mexico and amassed a record of 14–1 before joining the Ultimate Fighting Championship.

Ultimate Fighting Championship
Montaño made his promotional debut against Chris Heatherly on November 15, 2014 at UFC 180. Montaño won the fight via TKO in the first round.

Montaño faced Cathal Pendred on June 13, 2015 at UFC 188. He lost the fight by unanimous decision. Montaño tested positive for testosterone metabolites in the post-fight drug test and was given a one-year suspension.

Montaño next faced Belal Muhammad on September 17, 2016 at UFC Fight Night 94. He lost the fight via TKO in the third round.

Championships and accomplishments
Xtreme Fighter Society
XFS Middleweight Championship (One time)
Xtreme Fighters Latino
XFL Middleweight Championship (One time)
Xtreme Kombat
XK Middleweight Championship (One time)
Two successful title defenses

Mixed martial arts record

|-
|Loss
|align=center| 15–3
|Belal Muhammad
|TKO (punches)
|UFC Fight Night: Poirier vs. Johnson
|
|align=center|3
|align=center|4:19
|Hidalgo, Texas, United States
|
|-
|Loss
|align=center| 15–2
|Cathal Pendred
|Decision (unanimous)
|UFC 188
|
|align=center|3
|align=center|5:00
|Mexico City, Mexico
|
|-
|Win
|align=center| 15–1
|Chris Heatherly
| TKO (knees)
| UFC 180
| 
|align=center| 1
|align=center| 4:50
|Mexico City, Mexico
|
|-
|Win
|align=center| 14–1
|Santana-Sol Martinez
| KO (punches)
| Jackson's MMA Series 12
| 
|align=center| 1
|align=center| 1:38
| Pueblo, Colorado, United States
|
|-
|Win
|align=center| 13–1
|Jason Clayton
| Submission (punches)
| Jackson's MMA Series 11
| 
|align=center| 1
|align=center| 4:24
| Albuquerque, New Mexico, United States
|
|-
| Win
|align=center| 12–1
|Edwin Aguilar
| TKO (punches)
| Xtreme Kombat 17
| 
|align=center| 1
|align=center| 1:20
| Mexico City, Mexico
|
|-
| Win
|align=center| 11–1
|Rafael Arias
| TKO (punches)
| Xtreme Kombat 13
| 
|align=center| 1
|align=center| 1:09
| Mexico City, Mexico
|
|-
| Win
|align=center| 10–1
| Julio Cesar Cruz
| TKO (punches)
| Xtreme Kombat 9
| 
|align=center| 1
|align=center| 1:16
| Mexico City, Mexico
|
|-
| Loss
|align=center| 9–1
|Sam Alvey
| Decision (unanimous)
| Chihuahua Extremo
| 
|align=center| 3
|align=center| 5:00
| Chihuahua, Mexico
|
|-
| Win
|align=center| 9–0
|Edvaldo de Oliveira
| Submission (guillotine choke)
| Jungle Fight 22
| 
|align=center| 2
|align=center| 0:41
| São Paulo, Brazil
|
|-
| Win
|align=center| 8–0
|Jorge Enrique Macias
| TKO (punches)
| Xtreme Fighters Latino 4
| 
|align=center| 1
|align=center| 0:53
| Mexico City, Mexico
|
|-
| Win
|align=center| 7–0
|Lucio Hernandez
| KO (punches)
| Xtreme Fighters Latino 3
| 
|align=center| 1
|align=center| 2:06
| Mexico City, Mexico
|
|-
| Win
|align=center| 6–0
|Daniel Aragon
| Submission (rear-naked choke)
| Xtreme Fighters Latino 1
| 
|align=center| 1
|align=center| 1:46
| Mexico City, Mexico
|
|-
| Win
|align=center| 5–0
|Mike Lemaire
| Submission (armbar)
| MMA Xtreme 23
| 
|align=center| 1
|align=center| 1:41
| Cancun, Mexico
|
|-
| Win
|align=center| 4–0
|João Assis
| TKO (punches)
| Total Combat 33
| 
|align=center| 1
|align=center| 4:43
| Mexico City, Mexico
|
|-
| Win
|align=center| 3–0
|Alberto Lopez
| Submission (armbar)
| Xtreme Fighter Society 1
| 
|align=center| 1
|align=center| 0:57
| Mexico City, Mexico
|
|-
| Win
|align=center| 2–0
|Miguel Carrasco
| TKO (punches)
| Xtreme Fighter Society 1
| 
|align=center| 3
|align=center| 2:25
| Mexico City, Mexico
|
|-
| Win
|align=center| 1–0
|Jorge Serratos
| TKO (punches)
| Xtreme Fighter Society 1
| 
|align=center| 1
|align=center| 1:11
| Mexico City, Mexico
|

See also
 List of current UFC fighters
 List of male mixed martial artists

References

External links

Official UFC Profile

1984 births
Sportspeople from Mexico City
Living people
Mexican male mixed martial artists
Mexican sportspeople in doping cases
Doping cases in mixed martial arts
Welterweight mixed martial artists
Middleweight mixed martial artists
Mixed martial artists utilizing wushu
Ultimate Fighting Championship male fighters
Mexican wushu practitioners